Fernando, also called Ferran, is a former Barcelona metro station. The station site is located on line L3 between the existing stations of Liceu and Drassanes, and under the Rambla boulevard.

The station opened in 1946 as the terminus of a short extension of L3 from Liceu station. The station was closed in 1968 to permit the extension of the line to Drassanes station.

See also
Disused Barcelona Metro stations

References

Disused Barcelona Metro stations
Defunct railway stations in Spain
Railway stations in Spain opened in 1946
Railway stations closed in 1968